The Pallada-class cruisers (often known in Russia as "Diana-type protected cruisers") were a group of three protected cruisers built for the Imperial Russian Navy (IRN) in the late 1890s. One ship of the class, is still crewed by the Russian Navy, and maintained as a museum ship.

Background
The Pallada cruisers were built in the New Admiralty Shipyard in Saint Petersburg to reinforce the Baltic Fleet. However, the cruisers were intended to operate on commerce raiding operations worldwide, especially in the Far East. Initially the Imperial Russian Navy looked at foreign designs, including the Royal Navy′s  and then the  before deciding to proceed with a domestic design. Although the armor protection of the Pallada class was still light, it represented a significant improvement over preceding Russian cruiser designs.

However, due to the very long construction period required for these vessels they were already obsolete upon entry into service.

Design

The crew numbered 578 men.

The Pallada-class cruisers were armed with eight 152 mm 45 caliber Pattern 1892 guns, which was one of the best Russian guns at the time. These and the twenty-four 75-mm guns as secondary armament were Russian variants of the French Schneider et Cie Canet guns. The ships also were equipped with eight 37-mm Hotchkiss cannons and three 380-mm torpedo tubes, along with two Baranowski 63.5-mm-L / 19 landing guns.

Ships in class
Soon after her commissioning at the end of 1901 Pallada and Diana were sent to Port Arthur for use in the Russian Pacific Squadron. All three ships of the Pallada class were used in combat during the Russo-Japanese War of 1904-1905, but without significant success. Pallada was blockaded within the confines of Port Arthur and was sunk at anchor.  Diana broke out of the blockade in an attempt to reach home, but was interned in Saigon. Aurora sailed with the Second Pacific Squadron, which was annihilated at the Battle of Tsushima; Aurora escaped, but was interned at Manila.

After the war, Pallada was raised by the Japanese and commissioned into the Imperial Japanese Navy as the Japanese cruiser Tsugaru.  In World War I, Diana and Aurora served with the Russian Baltic Fleet. Aurora subsequently achieved fame for firing the shot which is considered the start of the Russian October Revolution.

Footnotes

References
 

Cruisers of the Imperial Russian Navy